On 30 July 2019, a Beechcraft King Air of the Pakistan Army crashed near Bahria Town, Rawalpindi. All five crew members, as well as 13 civilians, were killed when the plane crashed into a residential area.

References

Army military plane crash
Army military plane crash
Accidents and incidents involving the Beechcraft Super King Air
Accidents and incidents involving military aircraft
Aviation accidents and incidents in 2019
History of Rawalpindi
Army military plane crash
2019 military plane crash